This is a list of teams that once played in the ECHL but no longer exist.  This includes franchises which have relocated to different cities.  The years of operation only reflect the time in which the team was in the ECHL; it does not take into account any time in which the franchise operated in another league (such as the Central Hockey League, International Hockey League, United Hockey League or West Coast Hockey League).

Defunct and relocated teams prior to the ECHL's absorption of the WCHL

Defunct and relocated teams after the ECHL's absorption of the WCHL

Defunct and relocated teams after the ECHL's absorption of the CHL

References

ECHL
ECHL defunct